Dysoxylum cauliflorum is a tree in the family Meliaceae. The specific epithet  is from the Latin meaning "flowers on the trunk".

Description
The bark is grey. The sweetly scented flowers are white, pinkish or cream.

Distribution and habitat
Dysoxylum cauliflorum is found in Indochina, Thailand and Malesia. Its habitat is a variety of forests from sea-level to  altitude.

References

cauliflorum
Trees of Indo-China
Trees of Malesia
Plants described in 1875